Richard P. Coury (September 29, 1929 – August 15, 2020) was an American football coach. He served as head football coach at California State University, Fullerton from 1970 to 1971, compiling a record of 13–8–1. Coury was also the head coach for the Portland Storm of the World Football League (WFL) in 1974 compiling a record of 7–12–1, and the Boston/New Orleans/Portland Breakers of the United States Football League (USFL) from 1983 to 1985. He was named the USFL coach of the year in 1983 and compiled an overall record of 25–29–0.

Biography 
Coury was born to Lebanese-American parents, Thomas ("Tannous") and Mary Coury ("Khouri"). Thomas immigrated to the USA in 1903 from Beirut, and Mary followed in 1910. A 1951 University of Notre Dame graduate, Coury was not a football player, but served as a student assistant for head coach Frank Leahy. After graduating he enlisted in the U.S. Army where he, with a recommendation from Coach Leahy, became the backfield coach for the Camp Drake Bulldogs, a football team composed of U.S. Army Soldiers stationed in Japan during the Korean War. It would be the closest Corporal Coury would come to the shores of Korea. His first full-time coaching position was an assistant at Mater Dei High School in 1953 under head coach Tom Carter for two seasons, then under Steve Musseau until 1956. After four seasons, Coury moved up to head the program, compiling a record of 85–9–5 from 1957 to 1965. He then joined University of Southern California coach John McKay's staff as defensive coordinator in 1966.

Coury then moved on to California State University, Fullerton, serving as the school's first head coach in 1970 and 1971, tallying a record of 13–8–1.

Coury had also held coaching positions with the Denver Broncos, Houston Oilers, Los Angeles Rams, Minnesota Vikings, New England Patriots, Philadelphia Eagles,  Pittsburgh Steelers and San Diego Chargers in the National Football League. His last coaching job was with the St. Louis Rams before he retired in 1999 to become a scout.

Coury died on August 15, 2020, at the age of 90.

Personal 
Coury was the father of current Lake Oswego High School football head coach Steve Coury.

Head coaching record

College

References

1929 births
2020 deaths
Cal State Fullerton Titans football coaches
Coaches of American football from Ohio
Denver Broncos coaches
High school football coaches in California
Houston Oilers coaches
Los Angeles Rams coaches
Minnesota Vikings coaches
Military personnel from Ohio
National Football League offensive coordinators
New England Patriots coaches
American people of Lebanese descent
Notre Dame Fighting Irish football coaches
People from Athens, Ohio
Philadelphia Eagles coaches
Portland Storm coaches
San Diego Chargers coaches
USC Trojans football coaches
United States Football League coaches
Sportspeople of Lebanese descent